Arslanovo (Arıślan; , Arıslan) is a rural locality (a village) in Ishlinsky Selsoviet, Aurgazinsky District, Bashkortostan, Russia. The population was 50 as of 2010. There are 4 streets.

Geography 
Arslanovo is located 17 km north of Tolbazy (the district's administrative centre) by road. Yakty-Yul is the nearest rural locality.

References 

Rural localities in Aurgazinsky District